FBE may refer to:
 European Banking Federation
 First Bulgarian Empire
 Francisco Beltrão Airport, in Brazil
 Full blood exam
 Full Blown Entertainment, a music production company
 Fusion bonded epoxy coating
 UNSW Faculty of Built Environment, of the University of New South Wales
 Fine Brothers Entertainment
 Fleet Base East, a Royal Australian Navy major fleet base clustered around Sydney Harbour